Ilkhechi (also Romanized as Īlkhechī; also known as Īlīkhchī) is a village in Almalu Rural District, Nazarkahrizi District, Hashtrud County, East Azerbaijan Province, Iran. At the 2006 census, its population was 204, in 37 families.

References 

Towns and villages in Hashtrud County